DeAntoine Beasley (born January 8, 1979, in Atlanta, Georgia) is a retired American professional basketball player and current assistant coach for Gardner–Webb. He also played for the Plymouth Raiders in the British Basketball League.  The 6 ft 7 small forward attended Tennessee Tech, and signed with the Raiders in 2002.  After his retirement, he returned to Tennessee Tech as an assistant coach.

References 

1979 births
Living people
American expatriate basketball people in the United Kingdom
Basketball players from Atlanta
British Basketball League players
Plymouth Raiders players
Small forwards
Tennessee Tech Golden Eagles men's basketball coaches
Tennessee Tech Golden Eagles men's basketball players
American men's basketball players
American expatriate sportspeople in England